The 410th Contracting Support Brigade is a support brigade of the United States Army. Its mission is to plan and execute contingency contracting support for United States Army South in support of Army and Joint Operations throughout the United States Southern Command area of responsibility. On order provides contingency contracting support worldwide.

External links
410th Support Brigade at the Institute of Heraldry
Official homepage

Support 410